The 2018 Houston Baptist Huskies football team represented Houston Baptist University—now known as Houston Christian University—as a member of the Southland Conference during the 2018 NCAA Division I FCS football season. Led by sixth-year head coach Vic Shealy the Huskies compiled an overall record of 1–10 with a mark of 0–9 in conference play, placing last out of 11 teams in the Southland. Houston Baptist played home games at Husky Stadium in Houston.

Previous season
The Huskies finished the 2017 season 1–10, 0–9 in Southland play to finish in last place.

Preseason

Preseason All-Conference Teams
On July 12, 2018, the Southland announced their Preseason All-Conference Teams, with the Huskies placing one player on the first team.

Defense First Team
 Raphael Lewis – Sr. DB

Preseason Poll
On July 19, 2018, the Southland announced their preseason poll, with the Huskies predicted to finish in last place.

Schedule

* Games were televised on tape delay.

Game summaries

Southwest Baptist

at SMU

at Central Arkansas

at Southeastern Louisiana

Stephen F. Austin

at Northwestern State

Nicholls State

at Lamar

Sam Houston State

References

Houston Baptist
Houston Christian Huskies football seasons
Houston Baptist Huskies football